1st Arkansas Cavalry Regiment may refer to:

 1st Arkansas Cavalry Regiment (Dobbin's)
 1st Arkansas Cavalry Regiment (Crawford's)
 1st Arkansas Cavalry Regiment (Monroe's)
 1st Cavalry Regiment, Arkansas State Troops
 1st Regiment Arkansas Cavalry (Union)